I Remember Clifford is a 1992 album by Arturo Sandoval, the second album he made after leaving his native Cuba.

The entire album is a tribute to Clifford Brown, who was a great influence on Sandoval and who died in an auto accident in 1956, when he was 25 years old.

Title 
The album is named for Clifford Brown, who was killed on June 26, 1956 in a car accident which also killed pianist Richie Powell, and Powell's wife.

Sandoval's written tribute to Brown in the liner notes for the album ends:Everybody that I've spoken to, who knew Brownie, coincided in describing his heart and his simplicity as an artist. Modesty, feelings, dignity and virtuosity; not a bad legacy. ... It is with all my heart and soul that I offer this sincere effort to one of the greatest trumpet players of all time; a man who left his mark as a person and as an artist.

The album is named after the composition "I Remember Clifford", a threnody by Benny Golson, which was also written in memory of Brown.

In addition to a rendition of the Golson piece (using only a trumpet and piano - a tribute to the two musicians who died together), the album contains a long list of Brown's best-known standards (some composed by Brown himself). One final inclusion is a new composition, "I Left This Space for You", written by Sandoval in tribute, in which Sandoval plays only a restrained melody.

One very unusual feature, heard on five of the tracks, is the use of overdubbing to create a trumpet 'choir' of four harmonized trumpets, all played by Sandoval (a concept credited to Orlando 'Papito' Hernández, who had experience with multiple trumpets from his time playing with Herb Alpert). The 'choir' is used to play arrangements of some of Brown's own solos; the different trumpet lines are closely synchronized. Sandoval's own playing features in his own solos, especially on "Cherokee", which he takes at a faster pace than Brown's own rapid original.

The album received two nominations in the 1992 Grammy Awards ('Best Jazz Instrumental Performance - Individual or Group', and 'Best Arrangement on an Instrumental', for "Cherokee"). It was picked by critic Leonard Feather as one of the ten best jazz albums of 1992.

Track listing
 "Daahoud" (Brown, 4:57)
 "Joy Spring" (Brown, 5:42)
 "Parisian Thoroughfare" (Bud Powell, 5:57)
 "Cherokee" (Ray Noble, 5:07)
 "I Remember Clifford" (Benny Golson, 4:11)
 "The Blues Walk" (Brown, 6:45)
 "Sandu" (Brown, 5:17)
 "I Get a Kick Out of You" (Cole Porter, 5:11)
 "Jordu" (Duke Jordan, 8:25)
 "Caravan" (Ellington, Mills, Tizol, 4:26)
 "I Left This Space for You" (Sandoval, 5:53)

Personnel

Performers
 Arturo Sandoval – trumpet
 Kenny Kirkland – piano
 Charnett Moffett – bass
 Kenny Washington – drums
 Ernie Watts – tenor sax (tracks 1, 4, 7, 9, 10)
 David Sánchez – tenor sax (tracks 3, 6, 8)
 Ed Calle – tenor sax (track 2)
 Félix Gómez – keyboards (track 5)
 Gary Lindsay – arrangements (except on track 9)
 Alberto Naranjo – arrangement (track 9)

Technical
 Rudy Perez – producer, recording and mixing engineer 
 Peter Beckerman – assistant engineer
 Michael Bloom – liner notes coordination
 Joseph Doughney – post-production
 Ted Jensen – mastering
 Michael Landy – post-production
 Bo Post – album coordinator
 Andy Roshberg – assistant engineer
 Neil Tesser – liner notes
 Adam Zelinka – post-production

Producers
 Cal Griffin
 Dave Grusin (executive)
 Papito Hernández
 Larry Rosen (executive)
 Rudy Pérez

References

External links
 Arturo Sandoval home page
 [ AMG review]

1992 albums
Arturo Sandoval albums
GRP Records albums
Clifford Brown tribute albums